Professor Fabian Ngozichukwu Chinedum Osuji (born 20 January 1942) was the Federal Minister of Education in Nigeria from July 2003 until March 2005.

Academic career

An outstanding scholar from youth, Osuji attended Holy Ghost College, Owerri, Government College, Umuahia, the University of Nigeria, Nsukka and the University of Ibadan and performed his Post-Doctoral Research at the Imperial College of Science and Technology, London.  
He was a Lecturer, Senior Lecturer and Associate Professor in the Department of Zoology, University of Ibadan (1973-1981), and became a member of the University's Senate.
He also was a Visiting Scientific Fellow at the International Atomic Energy Agency and the Food and Agriculture Organization.
He was Dean of the College of Science, Dean of the College of Postgraduate Studies, Deputy Vice-Chancellor and member of the Governing Council of Imo State University. He was also a Visiting Professor to several universities within and outside Nigeria. Prof Osuji actively participated in the Development of university education in Nigeria through policy making, research and publications.  He has to his credit over 35 published papers and books. Osuji was later appointed Professor of Applied Biology, St. John's University, New York (CUNY) USA (1997-1999).

Later career

Prof. Osuji retired voluntarily from Imo State University in 1990 to pursue a career in politics. In 1991, he emerged as the Imo State Governorship candidate of the Social Democratic Party (SDP) with an unprecedented landslide victory. An enormously popular candidate, Osuji was heavily favored to win the governorship election ahead of the late Senator Evan Enwerem of the National Republican Convention. However, with a few days to the elections, the Federal Government of Nigeria, under General Ibrahim Babangida, inexplicably disqualified Osuji along with former Vice President Atiku Abubakar and other leading gubernatorial candidates in several states. Prof Osuji later served as Imo State Commissioner for Information and Social Development (1994-1996), and Pro-Chancellor and Chairman of the Governing Council of the University of Nigeria, Nsukka (2000-2003).

Prof. Osuji was appointed Minister of Education in July 2003. His appointment was widely acknowledged as a round peg in a round hole. He was dismissed by President Olusegun Obasanjo in March 2005 following his indictment by the Economic and Financial Crimes Commission (EFCC) for allegedly offering N55 million ($400,000) in bribes to the National Assembly to pass an inflated budget. Obasanjo announced the dismissal in a national radio broadcast that implied his guilt. The case was handed to the Independent Corrupt Practices Commission (ICPC) for persecution. In April 2005, Osuji was questioned by the ICPC, as were former Senate leader Adolphus Wabara and Senators Abdulazeez Ibrahim, Emmanuel Okpede, Badamasi Maccido and Chris Adighije.
In May 2005 Osuji appeared in the Abuja High Court along with Wabara and five lawmakers.

After extended legal battles, on 1 June 2010, an Appeal Court sitting in Abuja declared that the prosecution had failed to establish a prima facie case against Osuji, describing the government's actions as "embarrassing, barbaric and uncivilized" and subsequently quashed all charges against Prof. Osuji.
Prof. Osuji holds numerous traditional titles, most notably the Dike Eji-Eje Mba of Mbaise clan. He is married to Dr. (Mrs) Philomena Osuji and they are blessed with two daughters, three sons and six grandchildren.

References

1942 births
Living people
Education ministers of Nigeria
Peoples Democratic Party (Nigeria) politicians
University of Nigeria alumni
University of Ibadan alumni
Academic staff of the University of Ibadan
Government College Umuahia alumni